The Chora Church or Kariye Mosque is a medieval Greek Orthodox church building, mostly used as a mosque since the 1500s, in the Edirnekapı neighborhood of Istanbul, Turkey. It is mainly famous for its outstanding Late Byzantine mosaics and frescos. 

The building is an example of Byzantine architecture. In the 16th century, during the Ottoman era, it was converted into a mosque; it became a museum in 1945, and was turned back into a mosque in 2020 by President Recep Tayyip Erdoğan. The interior of the building is covered with some of the finest surviving Byzantine Christian mosaics and frescoes, which were left in plain sight during Muslim worship throughout much of the Ottoman era. They were restored after the building was secularized and turned into a museum.

The neighborhood is situated in the western part of the municipality of Fatih district.

History

First phase (4th century)
The Chora Church was originally built in the early 4th century as part of a monastery complex outside the city walls of Constantinople erected by Constantine the Great, to the south of the Golden Horn. However, when Theodosius II built his formidable land walls in 413–414, the church became incorporated within the city's defences, but retained the name Chora (for the presumed symbolism of the name see above).

Second phase (11th century)
The majority of the fabric of the current building dates from 1077–1081, when Maria Doukaina, the mother-in-law of Alexius I Comnenus, rebuilt the Chora Church as an inscribed cross or quincunx: a popular architectural style of the time. Early in the 12th century, the church suffered a partial collapse, perhaps due to an earthquake.

Third phase: new decoration (14th century)
The church was rebuilt by Isaac Comnenus, Alexius's third son. However, it was only after the third phase of building, two centuries after, that the church as it stands today was completed. The powerful Byzantine statesman Theodore Metochites endowed the church with many of its fine mosaics and frescoes. Theodore's impressive decoration of the interior was carried out between 1315 and 1321. The mosaic-work is the finest example of the Palaeologian Renaissance. The artists remain unknown. In 1328, Theodore was sent into exile by the usurper Andronicus III Palaeologus. However, he was allowed to return to the city two years later, and lived out the last two years of his life as a monk in his Chora Church.

Until the Conquest of Constantinople
In the late 13th and early 14th centuries, the monastery was home to the scholar Maximus Planudes, who was responsible for the restoration and reintroduction of Ptolemy's Geography to the Byzantines and, ultimately, to Renaissance Italy. During the last siege of Constantinople in 1453, the Icon of the Theotokos Hodegetria, considered the protector of the City, was brought to Chora in order to assist the defenders against the assault of the Ottomans.

Kariye Mosque (c. 1500–1945)
Around fifty years after the fall of the city to the Ottomans, Hadım Ali Pasha, the Grand Vizier of Sultan Bayezid II, ordered the Chora Church to be converted into a mosque — Kariye Camii. The word Kariye derived from the Greek name Chora. Due to the prohibition against iconic images in Islam, the mosaics and frescoes were covered behind a layer of plaster. This and frequent earthquakes in the region have taken their toll on the artwork.

Museum, art restoration (1945–2020)
In 1945, the building was designated a museum by the Turkish government. In 1948, the American scholars Thomas Whittemore and Paul A. Underwood, from the Byzantine Institute of America and the Dumbarton Oaks Center for Byzantine Studies, sponsored a restoration program. From that time on, the building ceased to be a functioning mosque. In 1958, it was opened to the public as a museum, Kariye Müzesi.

Reconversion to a mosque (2020–)
In 2005, the Association of Permanent Foundations and Service to Historical Artifacts and Environment filed a lawsuit to challenge the status of the Chora Church as a museum. In November 2019, the Turkish Council of State, Turkey's highest administrative court, ordered that it was to be reconverted to a mosque. In August 2020, its status changed to a mosque.

The move to convert Chora Church into a mosque was condemned by the Greek Foreign Ministry and by Greek Orthodox and Protestant Christians. This caused a sharp rebuke by Turkey.

On Friday 30 October 2020, Muslim prayers were held for the first time after 72 years.

Interior
The Chora Church is not as large as some of the other surviving Byzantine churches of Istanbul (it covers 742.5 m²) but it is unique among them, because of its almost completely still extant internal decoration. The building is divided into three main areas: the entrance hall or narthex, the main body of the church or naos (nave), and the side chapel or parecclesion. The building has six domes: two above the esonarthex, one above the parecclesion and three above the naos.

Narthex
The main, west door of the Chora Church opens into the narthex. It divides north–south into the outer, or exonarthex and the inner, or esonarthex.

Exonarthex

The exonarthex (or outer narthex) is the first part of the church that one enters. It is a transverse corridor, 4 m wide and 23 m long, which is partially open on its eastern length into the parallel esonarthex. The southern end of the exonarthex opens out through the esonarthex forming a western antechamber to the parecclesion. The mosaics that decorate the exonarthex include:

 Joseph's dream and the journey to Bethlehem
 The enrollment for taxation
 The Nativity
 The journey of the Magi
 The inquiry of King Herod;
 The flight into Egypt
 Two frescoes of the massacres ordered by King Herod
 Mothers mourning their children
 The flight of Elizabeth, mother of John the Baptist
 Joseph dreaming, and the return of the Holy Family from Egypt to Nazareth
 Christ taken to Jerusalem for the Passover
 John the Baptist bearing witness to Christ
 A miracle
 Three more miracles
 Jesus Christ
 The Virgin and angels praying

Esonarthex

The esonarthex (or inner narthex) is similar to the exonarthex, running parallel to it. Like the exonarthex, the esonarthex is 4 m wide, but it is slightly shorter, 18 m long. Its central, eastern door opens into the naos, while another door at the southern end of the esonarthex opens into the rectangular antechamber of the parecclesion. At its northern end, a door from the esonarthex leads into a broad west–east corridor that runs along the northern side of the naos and into the prothesis. The esonarthex has two domes. The smaller is above the entrance to the northern corridor; the larger is midway between the entrances into the naos and the pareclession.

 Enthroned Christ with Theodore Metochites presenting a model of his church
 Saint Peter
 Saint Paul
 The Deesis: Christ and the Virgin Mary (without John the Baptist) with two donors below
 The genealogy of Christ
 Religious and noble ancestors of Christ

The mosaics in the first three bays of the inner narthex give an account of the life of the Virgin, and those of her parents. Some of them are as follows:
 The rejection of Joachim's offerings
 The annunciation to Saint Anne: the angel of the Lord announcing to Anne that her prayer for a child has been heard
 The meeting of Joachim and Anne
 The birth of the Virgin
 The first seven steps of the Virgin
 The Virgin given affection by her parents
 The Virgin blessed by the priests
 The presentation of the Virgin in the Temple
 The Virgin receiving bread from an Angel
 The Virgin receiving the skein of purple wool, as the priests decided to have the attendant maidens weave a veil for the Temple
 Zechariah praying; when it was time for the Virgin to marry, the High Priest Zechariah called all the widowers together and placed their rods on the altar, praying for a sign showing to whom she should be given
 The Virgin entrusted to Joseph;
 Joseph taking the Virgin to his house;
 The Annunciation to the Virgin at the well;
 Joseph leaving the Virgin; Joseph had to leave for six months on business and when he returned the Virgin was pregnant, arousing his suspicion.

Naos
The central doors of the esonarthex lead into the main body of the church, the naos. The largest dome in the church (7.7 m in diameter) is above the centre of the naos. Two smaller domes flank the modest apse: the northern dome is over the prothesis, which is linked by short passage to the bema; the southern dome is over the diaconicon, which is reached via the parecclesion.

 Koimesis (the Dormition of the Virgin; i.e. her last sleep before ascending to Heaven). Jesus is holding an infant, symbolic of Mary's soul.
 Jesus Christ
 Theotokos (the Virgin and Child)

Parecclesion

To the right of the esonarthex, doors open into the side chapel, or parecclesion. The parecclesion was used as a mortuary chapel for family burials and memorials. The second largest dome (4.5 m diameter) in the church graces the centre of the roof of the parecclesion. A small passageway links the parecclesion directly into the naos, and off this passage can be found a small oratory and a storeroom. The parecclesion is covered in frescoes:

 Anastasis (literally Resurrection)": the Harrowing of Hell. Christ, who has just broken down the gates of Hell, is standing in the centre and pulling Adam and Eve out of their tombs. Behind Adam stand John the Baptist, David, and Solomon. Others are righteous kings;
 The Last Judgment, or Second Coming. Christ is enthroned with the Virgin and John the Baptist on either side of him. (This trio is also called the Deesis.)
 Virgin and Child
 Heavenly court of angels
 Two panels of Moses

Name
The original, 4th-century monastery containing the church was outside Constantinople's city walls. Literally translated, the church's full name was the Church of the Holy Saviour in the Country (hē Ekklēsia tou Hagiou Sōtēros en tēi Chōrāi). It is therefore sometimes incorrectly referred to as "Saint Saviour". However, "The Church of the Holy Redeemer in the Fields" would be a more natural rendering of the name in English. The last part of the Greek name, Chora, referring to its location originally outside of the walls, became the shortened name of the church. The name must have carried symbolic meaning, as the mosaics in the narthex describe Christ as the Land of the Living (hē Chōra tōn zōntōn) and Mary, the mother of Jesus, as the Container of the Uncontainable (hē Chōra tou Achōrētou).

See also
Icon of the Hodegetria
Monastery of the Panaghia Hodegetria
Church of the Virgin Pammakaristos
History of Roman and Byzantine domes

Notes

References

Literature
 Chora: The Kariye Museum. Net Turistik Yayınlar (1987). 
 Feridun Dirimtekin. The historical monument of Kariye. Türkiye Turing ve Otomobil Kurumu (1966). ASIN B0007JHABQ
 Semavi Eyice. Kariye Mosque Church of Chora Monastery. Net Turistik Yayınlar A.Ş. (1997). 
 Çelik Gülersoy. Kariye (Chora). ASIN B000RMMHZ2
 Jonathan Harris, Constantinople: Capital of Byzantium. Hambledon/Continuum (2007). 
 Karahan, Anne. Byzantine Holy Images – Transcendence and Immanence. The Theological Background of the Iconography and Aesthetics of the Chora Church (monography, 355 pp) (Orientalia Lovaniensia Analecta No. 176) Leuven-Paris-Walpole, MA: Peeters Publishers 2010.
 Karahan, Anne. “The Paleologan Iconography of the Chora Church and its Relation to Greek Antiquity”. In: Journal of Art History 66 (1997), Issue 2 & 3: pp. 89–95 Routhledge (Taylor & Francis Group online publication 1 September 2008: DOI:10.1080/00233609708604425) 1997
 Krannert Art Museum. Restoring Byzantium: The Kariye Camii in Istanbul and the Byzantine Institute Restoration. Miriam & IRA D. Wallach Art Gallery (2004). 
 
 Robert Ousterhout (Editor), Leslie Brubaker (Editor). The Sacred Image East and West. University of Illinois Press (1994). 
 Saint Saviour in Chora. A Turizm Yayınları Ltd. (1988). ASIN B000FK8854
 Cevdet Turkay. Kariye Mosque. (1964). ASIN B000IUWV2C
 Paul A. Underwood. The Kariye Djami in 3 Volumes. Bollingen (1966). ASIN B000WMDL7U
 Paul A. Underwood. Third Preliminary Report on the Restoration of the Frescoes in the Kariye Camii at Istanbul. Harvard University Press (1958). ASIN B000IBCESM
 Edda Renker Weissenbacher. Kariye: The Chora Church, Step by Step. ASIN B000RBATF8

External links

 Go Turkey – Turkish Tourism Promotion and Development Agency
 Official Website
 Columbia University Restoring Byzantium | The Kariye Camii in Istanbul and the Byzantine Institute Restoration
 Byzantium 1200 Chora Monastery
 Interior and exterior pictures in http://rubens.anu.edu.au (Dead link)
 Photos with explanations
 BYZANTINE MOSAICS OF CHORA MONASTERY 
 Well over 500 pictures of the Chora museum

11th-century Roman Catholic church buildings
Church buildings with domes
Byzantine church buildings in Istanbul
Museums in Istanbul
Byzantine art
Fatih
Religious museums in Turkey
Byzantine museums in Turkey
Historic sites in Turkey
Churches in Istanbul
Former churches in Turkey
Mosques converted from churches in Turkey